PT Telkom Indonesia (Persero) Tbk, also simply known as Telkom, is an Indonesian multinational telecommunications conglomerate. Telkom is listed on the Indonesia Stock Exchange and has a secondary listing on the New York Stock Exchange. The government of Indonesia owns over half of Telkom's shares outstanding.

Telkom has major business lines in fixed line telephony, internet, and data communications. It is operated as the parent company of the Telkom Group, which is engaged in a broad range of businesses which consist of telecommunication, multimedia, property, and financial services. Since 2008, Telkom Indonesia began changing its business focus, infrastructure, systems, organization, and human resources, as well as the corporate culture, in their effort to face rising competition.

After privatization in 1995, Telkom Indonesia's total consumer base grew by 7.8% in 2010 to 129.8 million customers at the end of December 2011, making the company the nation's largest telecommunication service provider in terms of subscriber count.

History
Telkom is one of the world's oldest telecommunication companies. The company can be traced back to an establishment of the first electromagnetic telegraph service in Indonesia on 23 October 1856, by the Dutch colonial government to connect Batavia (Jakarta) and Buitenzorg (Bogor).

In 1884, the Dutch colonial government founded a private company with headquarter in Bandung to provide postal and domestic telegraph services and, later on, international telegraph and telephony services.

Early years
Telephony services had been introduced to Indonesia in 1882 by privately owned companies under a 25-year government license.

In 1906, all postal and telegraph services in Indonesia were taken over by the government as single, unified government agency named Post, Telegraph, and Telephone Service (PTT).

In September 1945, roughly a month after the Indonesian proclamation of independence, the agency headquarters in Bandung was taken over by Indonesian nationalists.

In December 1949, after years of national revolution war, the PTT was nationalized by Indonesian Government as part of Indonesian effort to oust the remaining Dutch and nationalize Dutch corporate assets.

State-owned company
In 1961, PTT was converted from an official government agency into a newly established state-owned company, the Postal and Telecommunications Services company.

Four years later, on 6 July 1965, Indonesian Government separated this company into two state-owned companies; PN Pos Giro, responsible for providing mail services and PN Telekomunikasi as telecommunications services. The mail services PN Pos Giro developed over the year to become the Pos Indonesia in 1995, which is still state-owned today and the official postal carrier for Indonesia's 230 million people.

In 1974, PN Telekomunikasi was further divided into two state-owned companies. Perusahaan Umum Telekomunikasi (Perumtel) provided domestic and international telecommunications services, while PT Industri Telekomunikasi Indonesia (PT INTI) manufactured telecommunications equipment. A further division in 1980 saw the international telecommunications business taken over by the newly nationalized PT Indonesian Satellite Corporation (Indosat).

In 1991, Perumtel became a state-owned limited liability corporation and renamed to what is now Perusahaan Perseroan (Persero) PT Telekomunikasi Indonesia or Telkom. Until 1995, Telkom's operations were organized along twelve regional operating units known as Wilayah Telekomunikasi or Witel. Each Witel had full responsibility for all aspects of business and operations in their respective regions, such as telephone services, property management, and security.

In 1995, Telkom reorganized the twelve Witels into seven regional divisions and one network division. Under a series of Cooperation (KSO) Agreements, Telkom transferred the right to operate five of its seven regional divisions (I, III, IV, VI, and VII) to private sector consortia. Under these agreements, the KSO partners manage and operate the regional division concerned for a fixed term, build a specified number of fixed lines which at the end of the term, transfer the telecommunications facilities to Telkom for an agreed amount in compensation. Revenues from the KSO operations were shared between Telkom and the KSO partners.

Privatization
On 14 November 1995, Telkom became a privatized company when shares went on sale through an Initial public offering on the Jakarta Stock Exchange and the Surabaya Stock Exchange (which merged in December 2007 to become the Indonesia Stock Exchange). Telkom's shares are also listed on the NYSE and the LSE in the form of American depositary shares (ADSs), and were publicly offered without listing on the Tokyo Stock Exchange. Telkom is now the largest company by market capitalization in Indonesia, with a market capitalization of approximately IDR 190,512 trillion as of 31 December 2009. The Government retains an aggregate interest of 51.19% of the issued and outstanding shares of Telkom. The Government also holds one Dwiwarna, or golden share.

In mid-1997, Indonesia was badly affected by the Asian economic crisis. Among those impacted were certain KSO partners, who experienced difficulties in fulfilling their obligations to Telkom. Telkom eventually acquired control of its KSO partners in Regions I, III, and VI, and amended the terms of the KSO agreements with its KSO partners in Regions IV and VII to obtain legal rights to control the financial and operating decisions of those regions.

Since 5 June 2014, Telkom shares are no longer traded on the London Stock Exchange ("LSE"), and since 16 May 2014, they cease to be registered on the Tokyo Stock Exchange ("TSE") in Japan.

Telecommunication deregulation
In 1999, Indonesia passed a deregulating telecommunication law that set in motion a sweeping array of reforms and enlivened competition policy, private investment, and long term industry direction. Among the proposed reforms was the progressive elimination of the joint ownership, by Telkom and Indosat, of most of the telecommunications companies in Indonesia. This was intended to promote a more competitive market. As a result, in 2001, Telkom acquired Indosat's 35.0% stake in Telkomsel, resulting in Telkom owning 77.7% of the shares of Telkomsel, while Indosat acquired Telkom's 22.5% interest in Satelindo and its 37.7% stake in Lintasarta. In 2002, Telkom sold 12.7% of Telkomsel to Singapore Telecom Mobile Pte Ltd (SingTel Mobile), reducing Telkom's ownership of Telkomsel to 65.0%.

On 1 August 2001, the Government terminated Telkom's exclusive right to provide fixed line services in Indonesia and Indosat's right to provide international direct dial services. Subsequently, Telkom's exclusive rights to provide domestic and long-distance services were terminated in August 2002 and August 2003, respectively.

On 7 June 2004, Telkom began to provide their own international direct dial fixed line services. On 16 November 2005, the Telkom-2 satellite was launched to replace all satellite transmission services that have been served by previous satellite, Palapa B-4.

Transformations
In 2009, Telkom started doing the business transformation of the only company in the field of telecommunications to a broader range of business, the company expanded to the telecommunications, information technology services, media and edutainment. Telkom's decision to transform its business was prompted by the shift in customer lifestyles and supported by advances in technology and regulatory changes that enabled service providers to deliver enhanced service to customers. With this new business transformation, Telkom also plans to conduct the acquisition of several companies that are in line with Telkom's transformation of the new business.

In August 2012, the Telkom-3 satellite was lost in a launch failure, being placed into an unusably low orbit following the failure of the Briz-M upper stage of the Proton-M rocket that had launched it. Its replacement Telkom-3S successfully launched aboard an Ariane 5 rocket on 14 February 2017, 21:39 UTC.

In March 2019, Telkom Indonesia was one of the first Asian telcos to launch a cloud gaming service in coopération with Gamestream.

Operations
Telkom Indonesia is a dominant and largest provider of fixed line services due to owning most of Indonesia's copper network. Telkom also runs telephone exchanges, trunk network and local loop connections for its fixed-line telephones. Currently, Telkom is responsible for approximately 8.3 million telephone lines in Indonesia. And like most of the other state-ownership telecommunication companies in the world, Telkom is obliged to provide public services such as public call boxes.

Telkom Indonesia businesses are operated under government regulation by the Indonesian Ministry of Communication and Information. Telkom, as a government-owned company, is required to comply with additional obligations such as provide telecommunication services and not being discriminatory. As well as providing service in those regulated areas, Telkom has expanded into more profitable products and services where there is less government-owned-related regulation.

Telkom Indonesia is the parent company of the Telkom Group, which is engaged in a wide range of businesses that consist of telecommunication, information, multimedia, property, and financial services. Telkom mainly operates in fixed line telephony, internet and data communications business, while other businesses are run by subsidiaries.

Business divisions
Telkom now categorizes its portfolio into 3 Digital Business Domain:
 Digital Connectivity: Fiber to the x (FTTx), 5G, Software Defined Networking (SDN)/ Network Function Virtualization (NFV)/ Satellite
 Digital Platform: Data Center, Cloud, Internet of Things (IoT), Big Data/ Artificial Intelligence (AI), Cybersecurity
 Digital Services: Enterprise, Consumer

Subsidiaries and investments (Telkom Group)
 Telin (Telekomunikasi Indonesia International): International telecommunications services and investment company
 Telkomsel: Mobile phone services based on GSM and UMTS protocol
 Infomedia Nusantara: Information & communication services
 Multimedia Nusantara: Strategic investment and holding company
 Telkomsigma: IT, consulting services and data centre
 Finnet: Financial services
 Mojopia: Internet commerce business
 Melon Indonesia: Music and entertainment business (with SK Telecom)
 Admedika: Healthcare network provider
 MDI Ventures: Corporate Venture Capital
 TelkomProperty: Property development and management company
 PINS Indonesia: Trading, distribution, and integration CPE business
 Scicom: Global CRM consulting, technology services, education, and outsourcing company
 Daya Mitratel: Wireless telecommunication provider
 Telkom Akses: Wireline telecommunication provider
 Napsindo: Marketing business
Other investments:
 Patrakom: Strategic IT and telecommunications
 Bangtelindo: Telecommunication planning, construction, installation and maintenance company
 Pasifik Satelit Nusantara: Satellite telecommunications company
 Citra Sari Makmur: Satellite and terrestrial network company

Logos

See also
 Internet in Indonesia
 Telkomsel

References

External links
 
 Telkom Indonesia Business Structure
 Financial and Operational Facts

 
1850s establishments in the Dutch East Indies
1995 initial public offerings
Companies based in Jakarta
Companies listed on the Indonesia Stock Exchange
Companies listed on the New York Stock Exchange
Companies formerly listed on the London Stock Exchange
Government-owned companies of Indonesia
Government-owned telecommunications companies
Internet service providers of Indonesia
Mass media companies established in the 1850s
Mass media companies of Indonesia
Satellite operators
Telecommunications companies established in 1856
Telecommunications companies of Indonesia